Xyloskenea is a genus of sea snails, marine gastropod mollusks, unassigned in the superfamily Seguenzioidea.

Species
Species within the genus Xyloskenea include:
 Xyloskenea consors B. A. Marshall, 1988
 Xyloskenea costulifera B. A. Marshall, 1988
 Xyloskenea depressa B. A. Marshall, 1988
 Xyloskenea grahami B.A. Marshall, 1988
 Xyloskenea naticiformis (Jeffreys, 1883)
 Xyloskenea rhyssa (Dall, 1927)
 Xyloskenea translucens (Dall, 1927)
 Xyloskenea xenos Hoffman, Van Heugten & Lavaleye, 2010

References

 Marshall B.A. 1988. Skeneidae, Vitrinellidae and Orbitestellidae (Mollusca: Gastropoda) associated with biogenic substrata from bathyal depths off New Zealand and New South Wales. Journal of Natural History, 22(4): 949-1004
 Gofas, S.; Le Renard, J.; Bouchet, P. (2001). Mollusca, in: Costello, M.J. et al. (Ed.) (2001). European register of marine species: a check-list of the marine species in Europe and a bibliography of guides to their identification. Collection Patrimoines Naturels, 50: pp. 180–213
 Kano Y., Chikyu, E. & Warén, A. (2009) Morphological, ecological and molecular characterization of the enigmatic planispiral snail genus Adeuomphalus (Vetigastropoda: Seguenzioidea). Journal of Molluscan Studies, 75:397-418.

External links